The standard competition in dancesport at the 2005 World Games took place on 17 July 2005 at the König Pilsener Arena in Oberhausen, Germany.

Competition format
A total of 24 pairs entered the competition. Best eleven pairs from round one qualifies directly to the semifinal. In redance additional five pairs qualifies to the semifinal. From semifinal the best six pairs qualifies to the final.

Results

References

External links
 Results on IWGA website

Dancesport at the 2005 World Games